Howarth Glacier is a small glacier flowing south-southeast to Admiralty Sound along the west side of The Watchtower, in southeastern James Ross Island, Antarctica. It was named by the UK Antarctic Place-Names Committee in 1995 after Michael Kingsley Howarth (born 1932), Deputy Keeper of Paleontology at the British Museum (Natural History), 1980–92, and author of the Falkland Islands Dependencies Survey Scientific Report Number 21, Alexander Island.

See also
 List of glaciers in the Antarctic
 Glaciology

References

 

Glaciers of James Ross Island